Ninh Sơn may refer to several places in Vietnam, including

Ninh Sơn District, a rural district of Ninh Thuận Province
Ninh Sơn, Ninh Bình, a ward of Ninh Bình
Ninh Sơn, Tây Ninh, a ward of Tây Ninh
Ninh Sơn, Khánh Hòa, a commune of Ninh Hòa
Ninh Sơn, Bắc Giang, a commune of Việt Yên District